is a Japanese politician and former television reporter from the Democratic Party of Japan. She currently serves as member of the House of Councillors for the Hokkaido At-large district.

Before entering in politics she worked as reporter for some TV shows in Nippon Television, TV Asahi and TBS. She attended Hosei University in the Department of Law.

References

1962 births
Living people
People from Sapporo
21st-century Japanese women politicians
21st-century Japanese politicians
Members of the House of Councillors (Japan)
Democratic Party of Japan politicians
Hosei University alumni